Høybråten Church (Norwegian: Høybråten kirke) is a church dating from 1932 in Oslo, Norway. It was originally a burial chapel at a cemetery which was consecrated in 1929. However, the church was later rebuilt in 1932, and in 1966 it attained the status of a parish church.  One of the largest cemeteries in Oslo still surrounds the church.    

The bell tower is located in the middle of the ridge turret. The  church bells are produced by Olsen Nauen bell foundry in Tønsberg.   The altarpiece is a mosaic that was created in 1955 by Per Vigeland. The church organ at the organ loft is made by Jørgensens Orgelfabrikk (1974).

By the church is a memorial of local casualties during World War II, created by Dagfinn Hermansen and unveiled in 1947.

Høybråten Parish House was built near the church, and was finished before Christmas 2002.

Høybråten Church is a heritage site and is registered in the Cultural Heritage monument data base of Norway.

References

External links

Official website 

Lutheran churches in Oslo
Churches completed in 1932
1932 establishments in Norway
20th-century Church of Norway church buildings
Cemeteries in Oslo